John Gerdell Kennedy (May 19, 1900 – September 1971) was an American coxswain who competed in the 1924 Summer Olympics. In 1924 he won the bronze medal as cox of the American boat in the coxed four event.

References

External links
 Database Olympics profile

1900 births
1971 deaths
Coxswains (rowing)
Rowers at the 1924 Summer Olympics
Olympic bronze medalists for the United States in rowing
American male rowers
Medalists at the 1924 Summer Olympics